Conrad City Hall is a site on the National Register of Historic Places located in Conrad, Montana.  It was added to the Register on February 1, 1980.  The building is the oldest government building surviving in Pondera County, and it is still used as the City Hall.

It was built at instigation of a women's club, the Conrad Woman's Club.  It was built with architectural style and local brick which was standard for downtown buildings in Conrad in its era, but at date of NRHP listing was one of only four such buildings surviving.  It was deemed significant for its association with social, political, and government activities of the region.

References

City and town halls on the National Register of Historic Places in Montana
National Register of Historic Places in Pondera County, Montana
City halls in Montana
Government buildings completed in 1916
1916 establishments in Montana